John Fortescue (died after 1432), of Shepham in the parish of Modbury in Devon, was an English landowner and administrator.

Origins

He was born in the 1370s, the second son of William Fortescue (died after 1406), of Whympston in the parish of Modbury in Devon (the earliest recorded English seat of the Fortescue family) by his wife Elizabeth Beauchamp, widow of Richard Branscombe and a daughter of Sir John Beauchamp of Ryme in Dorset by his wife Margaret Whalesborough, and a co-heiress of her brother Thomas Beauchamp of Ryme. Elizabeth Beauchamp was of a junior branch of the Beauchamp feudal barons of Hatch Beauchamp in Somerset. Thomas Beauchamp died without issue, so his heirs to one moiety each became the descendants of his two sisters, the other of whom was Joane Beauchamp, wife of Sir Robert Challons, from whom the moiety descended to a member of the Carwithan family.

Career

Ives (2005) stated that "he was not a soldier, as historians of the family have claimed, but a local administrator and man of affairs, above all in the service of the Courtenay family", the Earls of Devon. It is therefore dubious whether he was at the Battle of Agincourt in 1415 or was appointed after the capture of Meaux in 1422 as captain of the captured town.

Marriage and children
According to Ives (2005), Fortescue's wife was called Clarice, whose family name is lost. However according to traditional sources he married Elinor Norries, daughter and heiress of William Norries (aliter  Norreis, Norreys) of Norreys in the parish of North Huish in Devon, by his wife a daughter of Roger Colaton. By his wife he had the following issue:
Sir Henry Fortescue, of Wood in the parish of Woodleigh, Devon, eldest son and heir, Chief Justice of the Common Pleas in Ireland, who married Jane Bozun, daughter of Edmond Bozun of Wood in the parish of Woodleigh. Wood became the seat of his descendants for several generations.
Sir John Fortescue (d.1479) of Ebrington in Gloucestershire, 2nd son, Lord Chief Justice of England and Wales, ancestor of the present Earl Fortescue of Ebrington, formerly of Castle Hill, Filleigh, and of Weare Giffard both in North Devon.
Sir Richard Fortescue, 3rd son, ancestor of the Fortescues of Punsborne in Hertfordshire, of Falkborne and of Seldon.

Fortescue monument
On the south wall of the south aisle chapel ("Fortescue Chapel") of the parish church of Weare Giffard in Devon, is affixed a mural monument, erected in 1638 by Hugh Fortescue (1592-1661). It is dedicated to three generations of the Fortescue family and mentions the family origins at Whympston and descent from Sir John Fortescue, Captain of Meaux, as follows in Latin:
Sunt hi ab Joh(ann)e Fortescue Equite Duce castri de Meaux in Gall(ia) sub H(enrico) 5.o (Quinto) oriundi qui praesepia Fortescutorum de Wimeston Devon ortus habuit fil(ium) Joh(ann)em Summum Justic(ium) et Cancell(arium) sub H(enrico) 6.o (Sexto) sepultum Ebertoniae Glocest(ria) Familia quidem perantiqua et etiamnum felici subole propagata sepulti sunt. 
Which may be translated as: 
"These arose from John Fortescue, Knight, Captain of the Castle of Meaux in France, arisen under Henry the Fifth, a scion of the Fortescues of Wympstone, Devon. He had a son John, Chief Justice and Chancellor under Henry the Sixth. He was buried at Ebrington in Gloucestershire. Indeed the very ancient family even now is happy with fruitful issue and are buried here".

Notes

References

John
15th-century deaths
People of the Hundred Years' War
1370s births
People from South Hams (district)